Benjaminia may refer to:
 Benjaminia (wasp), a genus of wasps in the family Ichneumonidae
 Benjaminia (plant), a genus of plants in the family Plantaginaceae
 Benjaminia, a genus of fungi in the family Mucoraceae; synonym of Benjaminiella